Social Democracy is  a political party in Serbia. The party leader is Nenad Vukasović. It took part in 2007 Serbian parliamentary election as an independent list but won no seats with only 0.12 percent of vote or 4,903 votes. It is one of four parties that won less than 10,000 votes even though they had to submit exactly the same number of signatures in order to be able to run in the elections.

References

Social democratic parties in Serbia